The 2nd Army Corps (Russian: 2-й армейский корпус) was one of the main formations of the Armed Forces of South Russia (Russian: Вооружённых Сил Юга России, ВСЮР; VSUR) during the Russian Civil War.

Commanders
Alexandre Borovski
Vladimir May-Mayevsky (1st formation)
Mikhail Promtov
Yakov Slashchov (2nd formation)
Vladimir Vitkovsky (2nd formation)

Chiefs of Staff
Arvid Conrad Appelgren
Vladimir Agapiejev
Vladimir Galkin
Fyodor Bredov

References

Military units and formations of White Russia (Russian Civil War)